Thomas Beall Davis (April 25, 1828 – November 26, 1911), of Keyser, West Virginia, was an American Democratic politician.

Biography
Davis was born in Baltimore, Maryland, and was the brother of Henry Gassaway Davis. He relocated to Howard County, Maryland, where he attended public schools. Davis moved to Piedmont in present-day West Virginia in 1854 and began working for the Baltimore & Ohio Railroad. He then relocated to Keyser, West Virginia, several years later, and he engaged in the mercantile, lumbering, banking, mining, and railroad building businesses.

In 1876 Davis became a Member of West Virginia Democratic State Executive Committee, serving until 1907. He entered the West Virginia House of Delegates in 1899, representing Mineral County until 1900.

Davis became a U.S. Representative from West Virginia's 2nd District in the 59th Congress, serving from 1905–1907 after the resignation of Republican Alston Dayton.

He died in Keyser and was buried at Maplewood Cemetery in Elkins. The town of Thomas, West Virginia is named for him.

References

1828 births
1911 deaths
19th-century American businesspeople
19th-century American politicians
20th-century American businesspeople
20th-century American politicians
Baltimore and Ohio Railroad people
Businesspeople from Baltimore
Businesspeople from West Virginia
Davis and Elkins family
Democratic Party members of the United States House of Representatives from West Virginia
Democratic Party members of the West Virginia House of Delegates
People from Howard County, Maryland
People from Keyser, West Virginia
People from Piedmont, West Virginia
Politicians from Baltimore